The New York, Susquehanna and Western Railway  (or New York, Susquehanna and Western Railroad and also known as the Susie-Q or the Susquehanna) is a Class II American freight railway operating over 400 miles (645 km) of track in the northeastern U.S. states of New York, Pennsylvania, and New Jersey.

The railroad was formed in 1881 from the merger of several smaller railroads. Passenger service in northern New Jersey was offered until 1966. The railroad was purchased by the Delaware Otsego Corporation in 1980, and saw success during the 1980s and 1990s in the intermodal freight transport business.

The railroad uses three main routes: a Southern Division running from Jersey City, New Jersey to Binghamton, New York and a Northern Division formed by two branches north of Binghamton serving Utica and Syracuse.  The Utica Branch is notable for street running down the center of Schuyler Street.

History

Before the New York, Susquehanna and Western Railway

The New York, Susquehanna and Western Railway can trace its roots back to the failed New Jersey, Hudson & Delaware Railroad (NJH&D), chartered in 1832 to connect industrial Paterson, New Jersey, east to the ports along the Hudson Waterfront opposite New York City at Hoboken and west to Pennsylvania at the Delaware Water Gap. Several competing companies sprang up in 1867 to make routes through this corridor, but the New Jersey Western Railroad (NJW) was the most successful, constructing westward from Paterson and Hawthorne. In 1866, the New York and Oswego Midland Railroad (NY&OM) was chartered to connect the Great Lakes port at Oswego, New York, with New York City. Construction on the NY&OM started in 1868 and progressed rapidly. The creation of this company prompted the NJW to shift its focus towards connecting to this route. Cornelius Wortendyke, president of the NJW, signed a lease agreement with DeWitt Clinton Littlejohn of the NY&OM giving his road a through route into New Jersey. Construction on the NJW had stretched from Hackensack, New Jersey all the way through to Hanford by the time it changed its name to the New Jersey Midland Railway (NJM) in 1870 and consolidated with three other competing companies, including the NJH&D.

The NY&OM reached Middletown, New York, and leased the connecting Middletown, Unionville and Water Gap Railroad (MU&WG), which reached the NJM at Hanford. The last stretch of construction from Hackensack to Jersey City completed the NJM in 1872. The first through train from Oswego to Jersey City operated on July 9, 1873. While the goals of the two partners had been reached, the Panic of 1873 caused financial ruin for both companies. The NY&OM suspended lease payments, and the agreement was broken. The NY&OM was reorganized as the New York, Ontario and Western Railway in 1879, and went its separate way. The NJM took over the lease of the MU&WG as well. Unable to weather the financial storm, the NJM was put into receivership in 1875. In 1880, the NJM was reorganized as the New Jersey Midland Railroad (NJM), and attention was once again turned to the lucrative coal fields of eastern Pennsylvania.

Formation and as an independent railroad

In 1881, the New Jersey Midland Railroad was consolidated with five other railroads to form the New York, Susquehanna and Western Railway. The new New York, Susquehanna and Western Railway had extended west to Gravel Place, Pennsylvania, and a connection with the Delaware, Lackawanna and Western Railway (DL&W).  The NYS&W also had a connection to the DL&W at Delaware, New Jersey via the Blairstown Railway.  Due to the increased volume of traffic, the railroad was double-tracked from Paterson to Jersey City in 1887. To reach the port on the Hudson River waterfront, traffic was handed off to the Pennsylvania Railroad at Marion Junction via the Hudson Connecting Railway. To keep more of the line haul revenue for themselves, the Susquehanna extended their line from their Little Ferry Yard through the new Palisades Tunnel to a new terminal at Edgewater where they had constructed coal docks for transfer from train to boat in 1892. The NYSW also reached west of the Delaware River and leased the Wilkes-Barre and Eastern Railroad to access the Scranton area directly and divert traffic away from the Lackawanna.

American financier J.P. Morgan began to take notice of this rapidly expanding coal-hauler, and quietly bought up its stock on behalf of the Erie Railroad. The railroad was leased in 1898 by the Erie, which soon after took over complete operation of the line.

The NYS&W was reported as the first Class I railroad in the US to completely replace its steam locomotives with internal combustion motive power, in the form of diesel electric locomotives, in early June 1945. By that time the railroad was profitably operating a suburban commuter passenger service across New Jersey, as well as being a bridge line for freight connecting to several regional carriers. Motorailers were employed for passenger service.

The NYS&W fell on hard times during the economic recession of 1957.  The NYS&W lost its western connection to the Lehigh and New England Railroad when the L&NE ceased operations in 1961, resulting in the NYS&W pulling up all its track west of Sparta Junction (which now comprises what is now known as the Paulinskill Valley Trail). Thereafter, the NYS&W sold-off its nearly new Budd passenger cars and replaced them with second-hand used equipment. Desperate to close its money-losing commuter service, the railroad's trustees offered its commuters $1,000 each to stop using the trains. Permission to end commuter service was granted in 1966.  Washouts caused by Tropical Storm Doria (1971) cut off other connections, and the railroad retreated to Butler, New Jersey.

Under ownership of the Delaware Otsego Corporation

The NYS&W declared bankruptcy in 1976 after failing to pay New Jersey state taxes, though managed to stay out of Conrail, which had surrounded it. The bankruptcy court ordered that the railroad be abandoned and its assets sold. By then, the NYS&W was down to a  line from Croxton and Edgewater through Paterson to Butler. The State of New Jersey, aware of Delaware Otsego Corporation's reputation at rehabilitating short lines, asked them to take over the railroad.

Delaware Otsego was founded in 1966 to operate a  section of the former New York Central Railroad Catskill Mountain Branch outside Oneonta, New York. This was the first of many cast-off short line acquisitions. Between 1971 and 1986, D.O. acquired several other branches and short lines, including the Cooperstown Branch of the Delaware & Hudson Railway in 1971; the Richfield Springs Branch of the Erie Lackawanna Railway (EL) in 1973; the Fonda, Johnstown and Gloversville Railroad in 1974 and the EL Honesdale Branch in 1976.

In 1980, the Delaware Otsego Corporation purchased the New York, Susquehanna and Western Railway.

In 1988, Guilford Transportation Industries, (now Pan Am Railways), then owner of The Delaware and Hudson Railway, declared that road bankrupt and abandoned it after two nasty labor strikes. The New York, Susquehanna and Western Railway was ordered by the federal government to operate the D&H until a new buyer could be found. In 1990, CP Rail (now Canadian Pacific) bought the Delaware & Hudson Railway System.

As of 2008, the tunnel carries a pipeline owned by the Amerada Hess Corporation.

In 1994, Onondaga County, New York purchased the former Delaware, Lackawanna and Western Railroad (DL&W) line into Syracuse, with the provision that the NYS&W operate RDC service in Syracuse between Syracuse University, Armory Square and the Carousel Mall, with the option for further routes, leading to the creation of OnTrack. With operations on this segment, the Syracuse branch was rehabilitated and the Conrail interchange relocated. Regular steam excursions were offered and RDCs refurbished for OnTrack use. Intermodal trains rolled beyond Binghamton to Syracuse for interchange with Conrail. After a few years, regular excursions were halted.

New ownership
With the impending break-up of the Conrail system to Norfolk Southern Railway and CSX Transportation, the NYS&W was a ripe target for acquisition, as it could potentially siphon lucrative traffic away from either road. On October 3, 1997, DOCP Acquisition LLC announced it had completed the short-form merger of Delaware Otsego Corporation (NASDAQ:DOCP) with a wholly owned subsidiary via a stock tender offer of $22 per share.

This deal essentially brought the New York, Susquehanna & Western Railway (NYS&W), under control of Norfolk Southern and CSX, as DOCP Acquisition LLC was owned 10% by Norfolk Southern, 10% by CSX and 80% by Walter G. Rich of the Delaware Otsego Corporation.

In 2005, the NYS&W leased the former Erie Main Line from Port Jervis to Binghamton from Norfolk Southern. Leased and operated under the name Central New York Railroad (CNYK), the CNYK is a "paper" railroad and all train operations and line maintenance is performed by Susquehanna personnel, while Norfolk Southern Railway retains overhead trackage rights. Currently, there are only 6 trains a week operated by the NYS&W on the line, one in each direction, three times a week. The Stourbridge Railroad (SBRR) depends on the NYS&W for interchange at Lackawaxen, Pennsylvania.

In 2006, NYSW's Utica Main Line had storm damage. The storm damage washed out sections of track in Chenango County putting the branch to Utica out of service. NYS&W continued serving customers on the line in the Utica area and south to Sangerfield from the CSX connection in Utica. In 2011, a project to restore the line was started by the Chenango County Industrial Development Agency with funding by the agency, Chenango County, the New York State Department of Transportation, and the federal Economic Development Administration. Work began in March 2016 with the clearing of brush along the  right-of-way in Chenango County. Subsequent work included filling in washouts, replacing ties, resurfacing bridge decks, repairing and reactivating crossing signals, and other repairs. The restoration project was completed and rail service restored in May 2017.

On August 9, 2007, Delaware Otsego founder Walter Rich died of pancreatic cancer. After Rich's death, the new president, Nathan Fenno, canceled all passenger operations and excursions and the fleet used on them was sold-off. Many older diesel locomotives were sidelined, retired and sold during this time as well.

In July 2011, NYS&W took possession of five leased CEFX locomotives, to ease the railroad's continually worsening power shortage. These five locomotives were used as a supplement to its current EMD 645 fleet in road train service, and occasionally on local duty. It was not uncommon to see road train line-ups consisting of entirely-leased power.

In 2021, the railway formally abandoned the Lodi and Passaic branch lines.

Passenger service restoration
The Bergen-Passaic Rail Line was a New Jersey Transit initiative in the mid-2000s, studying restoration of passenger service on a segment of NYS&W trackage between Sparta and Hackensack, New Jersey to alleviate traffic congestion on Route 23.  The project encountered delays when a suitable location for a NJ Transit rail storage yard in or near Sparta could not be agreed upon. In October 2015, U.S. Congressman Bill Pascrell joined state legislators in creating a coalition to revive the project, and in January 2016 the local governments of the involved municipalities passed concurrent resolutions to restart the project.

New FRA-compliant diesel multiple unit rail cars will be used. The project has been promoted via social networking blogs and Facebook,  resulting in Kinnelon officials publicly voicing support for the project.

Chinese steam operations and history

In the 1990s, NYS&W President Walter Rich wanted a China Railways SY type steam locomotive. The engine purchased, SY 1698M, was to be NYS&W #141, delivered eventually to Syracuse, New York. Transport was to be by cargo ship from the Tangshan Works in China via the Indian Ocean. Due to the Gulf War, shipment was delayed for several months. Then, the Norwegian freighter M/V Braut Team encountered a major cyclone in the Indian Ocean, flooded and sank on June 7, 1991, in the Bay of Bengal with all cargo lost.

After the loss of #141, NYS&W made an offer to the Valley Railroad to purchase their Tangshan-built SY #1647 steam locomotive, which the Valley Railroad accepted in 1992. The engine, altered and painted to look like a 1920s-era engine, was lettered and renumbered to #142, the next locomotive after the lost #141. The engine made runs throughout the NYS&W system, participating in such events such as the Steamtown National Historic Site grand opening in 1995, the Dunellen Railroad Days and Lincoln Park Railroad Days. The engine also has double-headed with other steam locomotives, such as Chesapeake & Ohio #614 and Milwaukee Road #261. The engine is now operated by the Belvidere and Delaware River Railway for tourist excursions along the Delaware River. The locomotive was pulled from service in late 2017 for a rebuild, which had not yet been completed as of late 2022.

Connections with other railroads
 The railroad has connections with two Class I railroads:
 CSX Transportation - Syracuse, New York; Utica, New York; North Bergen, New Jersey
 Norfolk Southern Railway - Binghamton, New York, Marion Junction (New Jersey) and the Passaic Junction (rail yard) rail yard in Saddle Brook, New Jersey
 The railroad has connections with five other railroads:
Morristown & Erie Railway and New Jersey Transit - Passaic Junction (rail yard), Saddle Brook, New Jersey
 Middletown and New Jersey Railroad - Warwick, New York
 Finger Lakes Railway - Syracuse, New York
 Mohawk, Adirondack and Northern Railroad (MHWA) - Utica, New York
Stourbridge Railroad - Lackawaxen, Pennsylvania

Stations

Rolling stock

Gallery

See also

 Delaware Otsego Corporation - Parent company for NYS&W
Susquehanna Transfer station
Hawthorne station (New York, Susquehanna and Western Railroad)
 Maywood Station Museum

References

Other sources
 Maywood Station Historical Committee
 
 
 
 
 Ontario & Western Railway Historical Society
 The Unofficial NYS&W Web Page
 Volunteer Railroaders Association
 Maywood Station Museum
 Southern Tier Timetable
 "THE NEW-JERSEY MIDLAND.; THE STOCKHOLDERS DEMANDING A SHARE UNDER THE REORGANIZATION." The New York Times, March 11, 1880

External links

 NYS&W Web Site — Official Corporate Site
 New York, Susquehanna & Western Technical & Historical Society
 Railfan.net NYS&W Site
 The New Jersey Midland Railway — NYS&W Early History
 Details operations at Hanford
 Photographs of the Northern Division
 Historical Photographs
 Susquehanna Surviving Locomotives and All-Time Roster.

 
Standard gauge railways in the United States
New York (state) railroads
New Jersey railroads
Pennsylvania railroads
Erie Railroad
Regional railroads in the United States
Former Class I railroads in the United States
Railway companies established in 1980